The Unknown Soldier is the tenth studio album by English folk / rock singer-songwriter and guitarist Roy Harper. It was first released in 1980 by Harvest Records and was his last release on the label. Half of the tracks were co-written with David Gilmour of Pink Floyd, who also plays guitar on the album. Kate Bush duets with Harper on one of those tracks.

History
The album was originally released on EMI's Harvest Records label (SHVL820) in 1980 (also Harvest ST6474 (CAN) and Electrola 1C06407259 (FRG)). In 1998 the album was reissued on Harper's Science Friction label (HUCD031).

Whilst duets are not commonplace on Roy Harper albums, Kate Bush accompanies Harper on the song "You". The song "Short and Sweet" features David Gilmour on guitar and is also found on Gilmour's first solo album, David Gilmour, released two years earlier. Harper also sang the song as a guest at one of Gilmour's 1984 concerts in London. In fact, Gilmour plays guitar on most of the album's ten songs and co-wrote five of them. Harper providing the lyrics and Gilmour the music.

Originally, the songs "I'm in Love with You", "Ten Years Ago" and "The Flycatcher", were to be released on the proposed earlier (1978–79) Harper album, Commercial Breaks. However, a dispute between Harper and EMI meant Commercial Breaks was not released until 1994. These three songs were re-recorded for The Unknown Soldier, and vary slightly from their original demo composition.

Track listing
All tracks credited to Roy Harper except where indicated

Side one
"Playing Games" (Harper, David Gilmour) – 3:12
"I'm In Love With You" – 3:45
"The Flycatcher" – 4:10
"You" (The Game Part II) (Harper, Gilmour) – 4:37
"Old Faces" (Harper, Gilmour) – 4:09

Side two
"Short and Sweet" (Harper, Gilmour) – 6:28
"First Thing in the Morning" – 3:40
"The Unknown Soldier" – 3:33
"Ten Years Ago" – 3:35
"True Story" (Harper, Gilmour) – 4:50

Personnel 
Roy Harper – vocals

Additional performers

Kate Bush – vocals
David Gilmour – guitar
Andy Roberts – guitar
Steve Broughton – guitar
Hugh Burns – guitar
Sal DiTroia – guitar
B. J. Cole – steel guitar
Tony Levin (misspelled Toni Levin) – bass
Jimmy Bain – bass
Will Lee – bass
David Lawson – keyboards
Pete Wingfield – keyboards
Don Grolnick – keyboards
David Bedford : orchestrations
Jimmy Maelen – percussion
Andy Newmark – percussion
George Constantino
Jim Cuomo
Timmy Donald
Neil Jason
Joe Partridge
Sara Pozzo
Dave Scance

Technical personnel

Peter Jenner – executive producer, producer
Chris Briggs – assistant executive producer
Roy Harper – producer, sleeve design and photography
Haydn Bendall – sound engineer, assistant producer
John Tropea – assistant producer
Stephen Galfas – assistant producer
Cliff Hodson – sound engineer
Danny Dawson – sound engineer
John Barrett – sound engineer
Phil Ault – sound engineer
Adrian Boot – sleeve design and photography
Peter Shepherd – additional sleeve design (German and Canadian release)
Gered Mankowitz – additional photography (German and Canadian release)

References

External links 
Roy Harper Official Site
Excellent Roy Harper resource
Roy Harper fan site
Verdun Memorial Website

Roy Harper (singer) albums
1980 albums
Harvest Records albums
Albums produced by Peter Jenner
Albums recorded at Rockfield Studios